Dupchanchia Government Pilot Model High School is one of the oldest high schools of Dupchanchia Upazila in the Bogra district of Bangladesh. It is situated on the bank of the river Nagor.

History
Dupchanchia Government Pilot Model High School was established in 1923. Although the school's name Dupchanchia Pilot High School 2013–2014 academic year Dupchanchia Government Pilot Model High School is to be renamed. The School's first Headmaster was Jitendranath Chowdhury.

Location
The school is situated near the police station of Dupchanchia on the bank of river Nagar.

Academics
This school teaches from class six to class ten. Upon a screening in class eight and class ten, students appear at the Junior School Certificate (JSC) and SSC examination respectively.

Notable alumni 
 Ramendra Kumar Podder, Vice Chancellor of the University of Calcutta (20 June 1979 to 30 December 1983)

Gallery

References

Educational institutions established in 1923
High schools in Bangladesh
Schools in Bogra District
1923 establishments in India